Guillermo Vilas defeated the three-time defending champion Ilie Năstase in the final, 7–6, 6–2, 3–6, 3–6, 6–4 to win the singles title at the 1974 Commercial Union Assurance Masters.

Draw

Finals

Blue group
 Standings are determined by: 1. number of wins; 2. number of matches; 3. in two-players-ties, head-to-head records; 4. in three-players-ties, percentage of sets won, or of games won; 5. steering-committee decision.

White group
 Standings are determined by: 1. number of wins; 2. number of matches; 3. in two-players-ties, head-to-head records; 4. in three-players-ties, percentage of sets won, or of games won; 5. steering-committee decision.

See also
ATP World Tour Finals appearances

References
1974 Masters Singles Draw

Singles